Jillian Morgese (born September 25, 1989) is an actress notable for her performance in the role of Hero in Joss Whedon’s 2012 film adaptation of William Shakespeare’s Much Ado About Nothing.

Life and career 
Raised in Fair Lawn, New Jersey, Morgese graduated from Fair Lawn High School in 2007, where she was more interested in athletics than acting.

Morgese, an alumna of the Fashion Institute of Technology who had determined to pursue an acting career, was singled out by Whedon as she was performing as an extra, a waitress reacting in fear and horror, then fleeing the scene, in The Avengers. Whedon refers to Morgese as having 'a quality which is undeniable'.

Filmography

References

External links

1989 births
Living people
Actresses from New Jersey
American film actresses
Fashion Institute of Technology alumni
Fair Lawn High School alumni
People from Fair Lawn, New Jersey
21st-century American women